Sabah Seghir (born 27 September 2000) is a professional footballer who plays as a midfielder for Italian Serie B club Napoli Femminile, on loan from UC Sampdoria. Born in France, she plays for the Morocco women's national team.

Club career 
Seghir has played for RC Saint-Denis and Saint-Maur in France.

International career
Seghir made her senior debut for Morocco on 10 June 2021, as a substitute in a 3–0 friendly home win over Mali. Her first match as a starter player was four days later against the same opponent.

See also
List of Morocco women's international footballers

References

External links 

2000 births
Living people
Citizens of Morocco through descent
Moroccan women's footballers
Women's association football defenders
U.C. Sampdoria (women) players
S.S.D. Napoli Femminile players
Serie A (women's football) players
Morocco women's international footballers
Moroccan expatriate  footballers
Moroccan expatriate sportspeople in Italy
Expatriate women's footballers in Italy
Sportspeople from Colombes
Footballers from Hauts-de-Seine
French women's footballers
French expatriate women's footballers
French expatriate sportspeople in Italy
French sportspeople of Moroccan descent